The 2011–12 UNAM season was the 65th professional season of Mexico's top-flight football league. The season is split into two tournaments—the Torneo Apertura and the Torneo Clausura—each with identical formats and each contested by the same eighteen teams. UNAM began their season on July 24, 2011 against San Luis, UNAM play their homes games on Sundays at noon local time.

In addition to the Primera División, UNAM will be participating in the CONCACAF Champions League for the third time in their history. It is their first appearance in the Champions League since 2009–10 where UNAM reached the semifinals. UNAM began their Champions League campaign on August 17, 2011 at home against FC Dallas of Major League Soccer.

Torneo Apertura

Squad

Regular season

Apertura 2011 results

UNAM did not qualify to the Final Phase

Goalscorers

Results

Results summary

Results by round

Transfers

In

Out

Torneo Clausura

Squad

Regular season

Clausura 2012 results

UNAM did not qualify to the Final Phase

Goalscorers

Results

Results summary

Results by round

CONCACAF Champions League

Group Standings

Results

Quarter-finals 

UNAM won 9–2 on aggregate.

Semifinals 

Monterrey won 4–1 on aggregate.

Goalscorers

Results

Results summary

Results by round

References

2011–12 Primera División de México season
Mexican football clubs 2011–12 season